Abū ʿAbdallāh al-Ḥalīmī al-Qāḍī al-Ḥusayn b. al-Ḥasan b. Muḥammad b. Ḥalīm al-Bukhārī al-Jurjānī al-Shāfiʿī also known as Al-Halimi (338/949–50 AH/403/1012–3 CE), was a Sunni scholar and was considered as the leading authority in  Transoxiana in the fields of hadith, fiqh and kalam. He was a traditionist who authored books and is regarded as an authority in the Shafi'i school and among early Ash'aris.

Biography
Al-Halimi was born in the year (338/949–50 AH) to a free woman from Gorgan and his half-brother, Abū l-Faḍl al-Ḥasan, was born the same year to a female Turkic slave. The place where Al-Halimi was born is disputed. It was said that he was born in Gorgan and was raised in Bukhara. Other narration states he was born and raised in Bukhara. He studied hadith under several masters, including Abū Bakr b. Khanb (not Ḥabīb) and others. He studied jurisprudence under Abu Bakhr al-Udani and al-Kafal ash-Shashi. After mastering these sacred sciences, he became an alim of high consideration and authority in Transoxiana. He was known for his brilliant researching skills and treating points of the Shafi'i law. When he moved to Nishapur, he taught hadith scholars such as Al-Hakim and others who gave narrations under his authority.

Death
He died in the year of 403 (1012 CE).

Influence
Many scholars who came after him would often quote him pertaining matters on creed and Usul al-dín (principles of the faith). Al-Bayhaqi frequently transmitted his scholarship in his Shu'ab al-Iman and Al-Asma' wa al-Sifat.

See also
 List of Ash'aris and Maturidis

References

983 births
1057 deaths
Asharis
Shafi'is
Hadith scholars
10th-century Muslim theologians
Sunni fiqh scholars
10th-century jurists
10th-century Muslim scholars of Islam
Sunni Muslim scholars of Islam